New Munster may refer to:

Places
New Zealand
 New Munster Province, a former province of New Zealand, consisting of the South Island alone (1846–53) and for some time additionally of Stewart Island (1841-46)
 New Munster, old name for the South Island

United States
 New Munster, Wisconsin, an unincorporated community